The SAMIL 20 is a 2-ton cargo vehicle produced in South Africa in the mid-1980s and was used asthe primary light cargo carrier of the South African National Defence Force. The vehicle design is based on the German Mercedes Unimog chassis and Mark I of this vehicle was based on the Magirus Deutz 130M7FAL 4x4 engine. In Mark II, the engine was replaced with an upgraded South African built water cooled diesel engine. The vehicle is still in use with the SANDF.
 

 South African National Defence Force.

Description
The SAMIL 20 is a light utility 4x4 military truck designed and built in South Africa for the South African Military forces. The chassis provide the basis for a wide range of cross-country vehicles. It has a forward control cab with a canvas roof and removable side windows. The cargo area is made of pressed steel with low steel sides and may be covered with a canvas top carried on a removable steel frame. A removable bank of back-to-back outward facing seats is fitted on the cargo centre-line accommodating ten seated troops. These seats may be removed and carried on the sides of the cargo area when the vehicle is used for general cargo purposes. The cargo area has four container locking ports to permit 20' containers to be carried. The spare wheel is mounted between the cab and cargo area and a manual light crane is fitted to allow wheel changes by a single operator.

The vehicle has differential locking facilities on both front and rear axles as well as on the transfer box. It has a short wheelbase with a ground clearance of 460mm and permanent 4-wheel drive. The initial Mk I vehicle was powered by a 6-cylinder air-cooled Magirus Deutz engines.  This engine was not suited to the heat and dust associated with military use in South West Africa, which lead to the development of the Mk II.

Dimensions
Data are based on SAMIL 20 cargo version:
 Length: 
 Width: 
 Height: 
 Wheelbase: 
 Ground Clearance: 
 Track (Front): 
 Track (Rear): 
 Angle of approach: 36°
 Angle of departure: 40°
 Fuel tank capacity:

Weights
 Gross vehicle mass: 
 Front axle rating: 
 Rear axle rating: 
 Payload:

Specifications
 Drive: 4×4
 Engine: 
 Mk I: Deutz F6L 913F 
 Configuration: 6 Cylinders in-line
 Capacity: 6,128 cc
 Cooling: Air-cooled
 Power: 93 kW (124 hp) @ 2650 rpm
 Torque: 383 Nm @ 1600 rpm
 Mk II: Mercedes OM 353 (License built Atlantis Diesel Engines ADE352) 
 Configuration: 6 Cylinders in-line
 Capacity: 5,675 cc
 Cooling: Water-cooled
 Power: 96 kW at 2800 rpm
 Torque: 363 Nm @ 1700 rpm
 Clutch 
 Type: Single dry plate
 Size: 
 Gearbox 
 Make/Model: ZF S5-35
 Forward gears: 5 Speed Synchromesh
 Transfer case 
 Make/Model: ZF Z65
 Type: 2 Speed, Permanent 4×4
 Differential Lock: Pneumatically operated
 Axles
 Front Axle: Full floating, double reduction
 Differential Lock: Pneumatically operated
 Rear Axle(s): Full floating, double reduction
 Differential Lock: Pneumatically operated
 Wheels:
 Single wheel all-round
 Tyre size: 14.5 x 20” – 12 Ply
 Steering type: Rhd – Power Assisted
 Brakes
 Service Brakes: Dual Circuit – air over hydraulics
 Park Brake: Pneumatically Operated
 Suspension Springs: Semi elliptical leaf springs
 Suspension Shock absorbers: Double acting telescopic hydraulic (Ft & Rr)
 Electrical
 Voltage: 24V
 Batteries: 2 x 12V 120 A/h
 Cab 
 Type: Forward Control with Canvas Roof
 Cab seating: Driver + 1 Assistant
 Access to Engine: Cab tilts forward
 Steering: Left-hand Drive
 Hard Top Roof

Variants
 Cargo/Personnel Carrier: 2-ton load or 10 back-to-back seated troops.
 LAD – Light Mobile Workshop vehicle for general repairs and vehicle services
 FCP – Artillery Forward Command Post vehicle
 Refuelling vehicle
 Battery Charger vehicle
 Telecommunications Repair
 Field Office
 Ambulance
 Kwevoel: Armoured mine resistant cab with standard cargo area
 Bulldog: Mine resistant armoured personnel carrier
 Ystervark: Kwevoel version with fixed mount 1 x 20mm GAI-CO1 20mm AA gun on cargo base
 Rhino: Mine resistant armoured personnel carrier (variation of Bulldog)

Citations and References

Citations

Bibliography

Cold War military equipment of South Africa
Military vehicles introduced in the 1980s